Germany's Boris Becker and Michael Stich defeated South Africa's Wayne Ferreira and Piet Norval in the final, 7–6(7–5), 4–6, 7–6(7–5), 6–3 to win the gold medal in Men's Doubles tennis at the 1992 Summer Olympics. It was Germany's first medal in the event, though German player Friedrich Traun had been part of a mixed team that won in 1896. It was South Africa's first medal in the men's doubles since 1912 (and first medal in any Olympic event since 1960, due to the 1964–1988 ban resulting from apartheid). Croatia's Goran Ivanišević and Goran Prpić and Argentina's Javier Frana and Christian Miniussi won the bronze medals, which were both countries' first medals in the event.

The tournament was held at the Vall d'Hebron complex on Montjuïc, Barcelona, Spain from 30 July to 7 August 1992. There were 30 pairs from 30 nations, with each nation limited to one pair (two players),  though the Moroccan and Hungarian pairs did not start.

Background

This was the ninth appearance of men's doubles tennis. The event has been held at every Summer Olympics where tennis has been on the program: from 1896 to 1924 and then from 1988 to the current program. A demonstration event was held in 1968.

Germany's Boris Becker and Michael Stich were prominent singles players, but not well known as a doubles team.

The Bahamas, Croatia, Portugal, Puerto Rico, San Marino, and Slovenia each made their debut in the event. Great Britain made its seventh appearance in the event, most of any nation.

Competition format

The competition was a single-elimination tournament. Unlike the pre-hiatus tournaments, there was no bronze-medal match. All matches were best-of-five sets. Tiebreaks were used for any set before the fifth that reached 6–6.

Schedule

All times are Central European Summer Time (UTC+2)

Seeds

Draw

Top half

Bottom half

References

ITF Olympic Site

1992

Men's doubles
Men's events at the 1992 Summer Olympics